The ABC Champions Cup 2003 was the 14th staging of the ABC Champions Cup, the basketball club tournament of Asian Basketball Confederation. The tournament was held in Kuala Lumpur, Malaysia between December 21 to 27, 2003.

Preliminary round

Group A

Group B

Knockout round

Semifinals

Finals

Final standings

Awards
Most Valuable Player:  Andre Pitts (Al-Wahda)
Best Scorer:  Andre Pitts (Al-Wahda)
Best Three Point Shooter:  Andre Pitts (Al-Wahda)

References
Asia-Basket

2003
Champions Cup
ABC
Basketball Asia Champions Cup 2003